Kiwane Lemorris Garris (born September 24, 1974) is an American former professional basketball player. He was listed as a 6'2" (1.88 m), 183 lb (83 kg) point guard.

Garris played college basketball at the University of Illinois, where his position was point guard.  As a freshman in the 1993–94 season, Garris finished second on the Fighting Illini in scoring, behind Deon Thomas.  In the next three seasons, Garris led the team in scoring and free-throw percentage.  Garris also led the team in assists in the 1994–95 and 1996–97 seasons.  Garris finished his career at Illinois as the second all-time leading scorer, behind former teammate Deon Thomas.  Garris finished with 1948 career points, with a career scoring average of 16.8 points per game.

During the NBA lockout he played for the US national team in the 1998 FIBA World Championship, winning the bronze medal.

Career
Although Garris was projected to be a late first round or early second round pick in the NBA Draft, he went undrafted, but signed as a free-agent with the Denver Nuggets. He had been signed for a brief period by Los Angeles Clippers during their 1997 preseason but was waived. For the 1997-1998's 28 games he did 8MPG, 2.4 PPG. Playing for the Orlando Magic during 1999–2000, 3 games, 7.7 MPG, 1.3 PPG. In 2002, he was signed by the Sacramento Kings (2002 preseason), but was again waived before the regular season. He has also played with the Grand Rapids Hoops of the CBA and for Alba Berlin in Germany.

Italian League
For nine years he played overseas for the Italian teams Banca Popolare Ragusa (Serie A2, 2001–2002), Porte Garofoli Osimo (Serie A2, 2002–2003), Bipop-Carire Reggio Emilia (Serie A2, 2003–2004, Serie A, 2004–2005), Climamio Bologna (2005–2006) (reached the Italian championship final and won Italian Supercup) and Armani Jeans Milano (2006–2007). After playing overseas in Italy for nine years from 2001 to 2010, Garris returned home.

Coaching career
He is a former assistant coach at Prairie State College and at Mountain View High School in Lawrenceville, GA. He hopes to become one of the assistant coaches at the University of Illinois. Currently he is the coach of the Fulton Science Academy Private School varsity basketball team.

Personal
Garris has son Kai from a previous relationship.

In July 2006 he became engaged to R&B and soul singer-songwriter Syleena Johnson. Johnson is a fellow Chicagoan. On August 1, 2007 after forty-four hours of labor, their son Kiwane Garris Jr was born. On Sunday, February 6, 2011, she gave birth to their second son, Kingston Garris He weighed 8 lb 5oz.

He said Italy is "his home away from home".

References

External links
Kiwane Garris player profile @ NBA.com
Euroleague stats @ 24sec.net

1974 births
Living people
African-American basketball players
Alba Berlin players
American expatriate basketball people in France
American expatriate basketball people in Germany
American expatriate basketball people in Italy
American expatriate basketball people in Poland
American expatriate basketball people in Turkey
American expatriate basketball people in Venezuela
American men's basketball players
Beşiktaş men's basketball players
Denver Nuggets players
Fortitudo Pallacanestro Bologna players
George Westinghouse College Prep alumni
Grand Rapids Hoops players
Illinois Fighting Illini men's basketball players
New Mexico Slam players
Olimpia Milano players
Orlando Magic players
Pallacanestro Reggiana players
Parade High School All-Americans (boys' basketball)
Point guards
Reyer Venezia players
Trotamundos B.B.C. players
Undrafted National Basketball Association players
United States men's national basketball team players
1998 FIBA World Championship players
Basketball players from Chicago
21st-century African-American sportspeople
20th-century African-American sportspeople